Jacques Joseph Marie François de Paul van de Werve, Baron of Schilde (1793–1845) was a member of a noble family of Antwerp.

Family 
He is the son of Philippe-Louis, 1st Baron of Schilde and of Marie-Louise della Faille. 
He married in 1843 to Charlotte de Cossé-Brissac, daughter of count Désiré-Thimoléon of Cossé-Brissac (son of the duke of Brissac); and of Anne-Charlotte de Montmorency-Tancarville, Princess of Robech (daughter of the Prince of Montmorency and of Tancarville). 

They had only one son:
 Baron Henri van de Werve et de Schilde (1844–1924), he married Jeanne de Béthisy.

References 

1793 births
1845 deaths
Jacques
Jacques